Other Lives but Mine is a 2009 non-fiction book by the French writer Emmanuel Carrère. It was published as Lives Other Than My Own in the United States. It focuses on Carrère's wife's sister, a judge who died from cancer in 2005.

It was adapted to a screenplay for the 2011 French film All Our Desires.

See also
 2009 in literature
 Contemporary French literature

References

2009 non-fiction books
French biographies